James Monroe (1816July 16, 1899) was a Michigan politician.

Early life
James Monroe was born in New York in 1816. James' father was Stephen Monroe. In 1838, James settled in Albion, Michigan.

Career
In 1848, Monroe started a stove manufacturing shop. He continued this business until 1859. In 1850, Monroe was elected Calhoun County sheriff, as a Whig. He served from 1851 to 1852. In 1854, Monroe attended the organization of the Michigan Republican Party, in Jackson. Monroe also spent the mid-1850s securing land grants for railroad companies. On November 4, 1856, Monroe was elected to the Michigan House of Representatives as a  Republican, where he represented the Calhoun County 1st district from January 1, 1857 to December 31, 1860. In 1861, after the beginning of the American Civil War, President Abraham Lincoln appointed Monroe provost marshal at Albion, though Monroe only served for a few months before his resignation. Later, President Chester A. Arthur appointed Monroe United States marshal for the western district of Michigan, centered at Grand Rapids.

Personal life
Monroe married Harriet around 1841. Together, they had five children.

Death
Monroe later lived in Kalamazoo, Michigan. Monroe died on July 16, 1899 in Kalamazoo.

References

1816 births
1899 deaths
Michigan sheriffs
People from New York (state)
People from Albion, Michigan
Politicians from Kalamazoo, Michigan
Michigan Whigs
Republican Party members of the Michigan House of Representatives
United States Marshals
19th-century American politicians